America's Next Top Model (abbreviated ANTM and Top Model) is an American reality television series and interactive competition in which a number of aspiring models compete for the title of "America's Next Top Model" and a chance to begin their career in the modeling industry. Created by Tyra Banks, who also serves as an executive producer, and developed by Ken Mok and Kenya Barris, the series premiered in May 2003, and aired semiannually until 2012, then annually from 2013. The first six seasons (referred to as "cycles") aired on UPN, before UPN merged with The WB to create The CW in 2006. The following sixteen cycles aired on The CW until the series was first cancelled in October 2015. The series was revived in 2016 and has been airing on VH1 ever since. The series was among the highest-rated programs on UPN and was the highest-rated show on The CW from 2007 to 2010. Advertisers paid $61,315 per 30-second slot during the 2011–12 television season, the highest of any series on The CW. The first 22 cycles of the series and cycle 24 were presented by Banks, while cycle 23 was presented by Rita Ora. The series also employs a panel of two or three additional judges, a creative director and a runway coach.

Cycles 1–16, 19 and 23–24 each consisted of a cast of 10–15 female contestants with no previous participation on the series. Cycle 17's cast consisted entirely of previous participants, while cycle 18's had seven new contestants and seven former Britain's Next Top Model participants. Cycles 20–22 featured male contestants in the contest, including two male winners. , 24 people have won the competition. Winners typically receive a feature in a magazine and a contract with a modeling agency, among other prizes. The series is the originator of the international Top Model franchise. Over fifty versions of the series have been produced internationally.

Background

It was announced on January 24, 2006, that Top Model would be part of the new The CW network, a merge between UPN and The WB, when the seventh cycle started in September airing on Wednesdays. The series became the first series among regular programming to air on the network. Prior to the announcement of merging with The WB, UPN had committed to renewing the series through its ninth cycle on January 20, 2006, for which casting was conducted throughout mid-2006. America's Next Top Model was the only show left on the network that was originally from UPN.

On July 21, 2006, the writers of America's Next Top Model went on strike while working on cycle 7, set to premiere on the new CW Network in September 2006. The writers sought representation through the Writers Guild of America, West, which would allow them regulated wages, access to portable health insurance, and pension benefits. These benefits would be similar to those given to writers on scripted shows. The strike was the focus of a large rally of Hollywood writers coinciding with the premiere of the new network on September 20, 2006. The dispute was chronicled in a July 24 interview on the website Television Without Pity with Daniel J. Blau, a former recapper on the site who covered the series, and at the time was an America's Next Top Model show producer. In November 2006, the writers on strike were taken off payroll.

To celebrate its tenth cycle, America's Next Top Model aired a special installment called America's Next Top Model: Exposed in two parts on the CW on Wednesday, February 6 & 13, 2008. It reviewed the best catfights, mishaps and most memorable photo shoots, personalities, defining moments and contained other segments about the show since cycles 1 to 9, and featured a special opening fusing all three openings together. Camille McDonald (cycles 2 and 17), Toccara Jones (cycle 3), Eva Pigford (cycle 3 winner), Bre Scullark (cycles 5 and 17), Cassandra Whitehead (cycle 5), Joanie Dodds (cycle 6), Jael Strauss (cycle 8), Dionne Walters (cycle 8), Heather Kuzmich (cycle 9), and Bianca Golden (cycles 9 and 17) all returned to comment on events that happened in their or other cycles.

After announcing that the seventeenth season would be an All-Stars version, Banks said on The CW upfronts in May 2011, that there wouldn't be a "normal" season of the show anymore. With the start of the eighteenth British Invasion cycle, the program converted to high definition, becoming the second-to-last primetime show on the five major English-language broadcast networks in the United States to make the switch, and the last to air in the regular season to do so.

The show is syndicated to NBCUniversal's cable division, with Oxygen as well as Style Network carrying the series, usually in marathon form throughout the daytime period on either network, and running through most of or an entire cycle. Bravo, MTV, and VH1 have also aired the series in the past. E! also currently airs reruns of ANTM.

Format

Each cycle of America's Next Top Model has 9–16 episodes and starts with 10–16 contestants. Contestants are judged weekly on their overall appearance, participation in challenges, and best shot from that week's photo shoot; each episode, one contestant is eliminated, though in rare cases a double elimination or no elimination was given by consensus of the judging panel. Makeovers are administered to contestants early in the season (usually after the first or second elimination in the finals) and a trip to an international destination is scheduled about two-thirds of the way through the cycle.

Judges and other staff members
The series employs a panel of judges who critique contestants' progress throughout the competition. Throughout its broadcast, the program has employed seventeen different judges. The original panel consisted of Banks (who also serves as its presenter), Janice Dickinson, Kimora Lee Simmons, and Beau Quillian. Quillian and Simmons were replaced by Nigel Barker and Eric Nicholson in cycle 2, before Nicholson was replaced by Nolé Marin in cycle 3. After cycle 4, Marin and Dickinson were replaced by J. Alexander and Twiggy in cycle 5. Paulina Porizkova joined the panel in cycle 10, in place of Twiggy. After cycle 12, Porizkova was fired by Banks and the panel was left with three judges (Banks, Alexander and Barker) in cycle 13. In cycle 14, Alexander left the panel and was replaced by André Leon Talley, but continued as the series' runway coach. In cycle 18, Kelly Cutrone replaced Talley. After cycle 18, Banks fired long-standing cast members Barker, Alexander and photo shoot director Jay Manuel. Barker was replaced by Rob Evans in cycle 19, and Manuel by Johnny Wujek. Alexander returned to the panel in cycle 21 in place of Evans. 
For cycle 23 the entire panel, including Banks, was replaced with Rita Ora, Ashley Graham, Drew Elliott and Law Roach while Stacey McKenzie replaced Alexander as runway coach. For the 24th cycle, Banks returned as the main judge and presenter, replacing Ora, while the rest of the personnel remained unchanged.

In the first eighteen cycles, an additional guest judge was welcomed to the panel each week. For the nineteenth and twentieth cycles, public voting was represented on the panel by Bryanboy. For the twenty-first cycle public voting was simply presented on screen doing call-out.

Though not a judge, Jay Manuel served as the creative director during contestants' photo shoots for the first to eighteenth cycles. During the nineteenth and twentieth cycles, Johnny Wujek replaced Manuel as the creative director of all the shoots, and Yu Tsai replaced Wujek in the twenty-first and twenty-second cycles. Elliot served as both judge and creative director in cycle 23 and 24.

List of judges and other staff members

Series overview

Los Angeles has been the primary filming location of most of the seasons. The first three seasons of America's Next Top Model were filmed in New York City, along with seasons 10, 12 and 14; the latter three seasons were altered due to Banks's duties in The Tyra Banks Show, and 23.

Notes

Partnerships
America's Next Top Model was also connected with Banks' talk show, on which several contestants have appeared, most notably Natasha Galkina (cycle 8), who worked as a correspondent for the show. The show's stage was also used for the cycle 5 reunion show.

In 2008, Banks launched a new reality show inside the Tyra Show, called Modelville which featured past contestants Renee DeWitt (cycle 8), Bianca Golden (cycle 9), Dominique Reighard, Fatima Siad and Lauren Utter (all cycle 10) vying for a $50,000 contract with Carol's Daughter. The competition was ultimately won by Reighard.

The ANTM franchise released a clothing and accessories line based on the television show, which is sold at most Walmart stores. It ranges from cosmetic products to handbags.

America's Next Top Model Dolls

The America's Next Top Model Dolls were a short-lived fashion doll line released by MGA Entertainment as a promotional tie-in with the show of the same name. The dolls were designed by MGA doll designer Lui Domingo and released in the fall of 2008.

The dolls came as a result of the legal battle between Mattel and MGA over their fashion doll rivalry between Barbie and Bratz. When MGA temporarily lost the rights to the Bratz dolls to Mattel, the company scrambled to come up with an emergency release line to replace Bratz in the meantime. The America's Next Top Model Dolls were the result, as a form of competition with Mattel's Top Model Barbie line that was released a year prior, but had no affiliation with this show. The concept art, sketches, and prototypes initially revealed 4 main characters, Sienna (a blonde-haired, blue-eyed Caucasian), Sydney (a brunette Asian), Paisley (a red-haired Caucasian), and Tascha (an African American). The Tascha prototype would not make it to production (but still be featured in all of the marketing), due to MGA's fears that the doll, being African American, would sell poorly, as black dolls have historically been known to be picked up in low quantities or not picked at all by stores and retailers if they believed they wouldn't sell, especially if they're located in cities with a low black population. Resulting from the financial losses incurred from their legal battle with Mattel, the dolls would ultimately not feature the majority of the accessories that were advertised with them, likely a cost-cutting measure (which is also why Tascha was excluded from the doll line).

Only two waves would be released, Swimwear and Day-to-Night wear, all featuring only Sienna, Sydney, and Paisley. Four fashion packs were also released for the dolls, each featuring images of the four characters, including the never produced Tascha doll. The box for the dolls also made it clear under the logo that they were the only officially licensed dolls from the hit TV show, to differentiate them from Mattel's Top Model Barbie line. The boxes also featured before and after images of the dolls, in reference to the makeovers on the show, and the back of the box also included a backstory for each doll to show that they had multi-faceted personalities and dream careers besides modeling, to counter the accusations that the dolls would be poor role models for children. The dolls had proportions different to that of other MGA fashion dolls, with slightly smaller heads and more Barbie-esque bodies, with jointed torsos for posing and arms molded to be able to rest on their hips. The dolls also noticeably used leftovers from the Bratz line as part of their accessories, as the clothes were stitched from leftover Bratz clothing fabric, and the jewelry was simply repurposed from prior Bratz dolls.

The dolls were a financial failure, selling very poorly in spite of their association with the show (which had been declining in ratings by the time the dolls debuted), and were promptly discontinued after only two waves of dolls.

Deceased contestants
2015:  Eighth-placing finalist Mirjana Puhar (cycle 21) was shot and killed on February 24, 2015 in her boyfriend's home in Charlotte, North Carolina.

2016: Kimberly Rydzewski (cycle 10) died on December 19, 2016. She was 29 years old.

2018: On December 4, 2018 Jael Strauss (cycle 8) died at age 34 due to stage 4 breast cancer.

Reception

Impact in pop culture
The show has been referred to in many series, such as ABC Family's GREEK, CBS's The Big Bang Theory, and Fox's Family Guy. It also had its own E! True Hollywood Story episode, featuring past contestants Ebony Haith, Giselle Samson, Elyse Sewell (all cycle 1), Adrianne Curry (cycle 1 winner), Camille McDonald (cycles 2 & 17), April Wilkner, Mercedes Scelba-Shorte (both cycle 2), Toccara Jones, Ann Markley, Amanda Swafford (all cycle 3), Eva Pigford (cycle 3 winner), Michelle Deighton (cycle 4), Brittany Brower (cycles 4 & 17), Naima Mora (cycle 4 winner), Ebony Taylor (cycle 5), Lisa D'Amato (cycle 5 & cycle 17 winner), Kim Stolz (cycle 5) and Bre Scullark (cycles 5 & 17) as well as judges & personals Janice Dickinson, Tyra Banks, Nigel Barker, J. Alexander, Jay Manuel, Ken Mok and Michelle Mock-Falcon. It covered the first five cycles and recently re-aired with a few added minutes of footage which cover cycles 6 to 10 and Stylista.

In 2009, Oxygen Network aired a series based on the show called Top Model Obsessed, featuring past contestants Lisa D'Amato (cycle 5 & cycle 17 winner), CariDee English (cycle 7 winner) and Bianca Golden (cycles 9 & 17).

Many credit America's Next Top Model for inspiring later reality TV shows, most notably RuPaul's Drag Race. Kevin O'Keefe and Mathew Rodriguez noted that America's Next Top Model served as "the biggest inspiration" for the show and that season 1 of RuPaul's Drag Race was "a parody of a couple different reality shows ... but more so (of) America's Next Top Model". They explain that "Top Model was a groundbreaking reality show" and that "it crawled so that Drag Race could walk". They drew parallels between Tyra Banks and RuPaul as black people "who (have) been at the top of their field" and "play a persona" on their respective shows. They also compared the judging panels, comparing Michelle Visage to Nigel Barker as an "anchor main judge" who is "harsher in their critiques", although contrasted RuPaul's judges with Tyra's, stating that "RuPaul has never allowed a drag queen to sit on the panel the way Tyra would bring in either Janice Dickinson then Twiggy." Moreover, the "first mini challenge of the first several seasons of Drag Race used to always be a photoshoot" and season 6's photoshoot of jumping off a platform was "directly taken from a photoshoot in season 6 of ANTM, where they had to play fairy tale characters and jump" off a platform. Another "artefact" of Top Model's influence on the show comes from Drag Races focus on runway, with season 8 contestant Kim Chi being "criticised for not having a model walk". Most importantly, America's Next Top Model "was one of the most queer shows on TV" with regard to the inclusion of Jay Manuel, J. Alexander and Benny Ninja on the judging panel and numerous openly LGBTQ+ contestants, most notably Isis King. It was "covertly queer enough to make the space on TV for something as queer as Drag Race."

U.S. television ratings
For the 2006–2009 and 2010–2011 television seasons, America's Next Top Model was the No.1 show in average viewers on The CW.

Each U.S. network television season starts in late September and ends in late May, which coincides with the completion of May sweeps.

Notes

Criticism
Yahoo!'s Shine lifestyle website said the show contained cruelty and elements of humiliation, and that some critiques from the judges are "really cruel and cringe-inducing", claiming that the show "humiliates and degrades young women." The site created the list "10 reasons why 'America's Next Top Model' is bad for women, humans", citing such things as giving the contestants and women viewers unrealistic visions of life as a model, and "always espousing empowerment and female strength and then forcing the contestants into embarrassing scenarios far outside the realm of real-life modeling". One such scenario highlighted was when cycle 12's final two contestants "were made to wear bikinis so skimpy that the producers had to blur out Allison Harvard's butt cheeks", and performed a "creepily sexual mud fight," after which contestant and winner Teyona Anderson was "commended for taking her weave in her hand and whipping it around on the runway like a sexy feather boa."

Allure magazine criticized the show in its October 2006 issue, saying that ANTM "hasn't exactly produced any actual supermodels."

Ken Mok and Banks noticed that most of cycle 8's girls were unusually heavy smokers. "Tyra and I understand the influence 'Top Model' has on a generation of young people, and we want to make sure we get the right message to our audience," Mok said, which then prompted the "green" theme of cycle 9.

The winner of cycle 9, Saleisha Stowers, was discovered to have been in a Wendy's commercial, on a catwalk in the cycle 6 show and an episode of Tyra Banks Show prior to her participation. The rules of the competition stated that a contestant must not have appeared as a model in a national campaign during the five years prior to the production of the cycle in which they participate. The CW network said she had revealed her role in the Wendy's commercial, and "after reviewing the commercial, it was determined that her appearance did not amount to 'modeling' experience, and therefore did not exclude her from participating in the show."

After filming cycle 10, the producers of America's Next Top Model were served with a lawsuit from Michael Marvisi, the owner of the loft used as the Top Model house. The lawsuit claimed that the contestants as well as the production crew caused an estimated $500,000 in damages to the loft. Marvisi claims the contestants engaged in food fights, made holes in the walls, caused water damage to the bathroom, damaged a $15,000 chandelier beyond repair, and caused $90,000 worth of damage to an electrical store. Also, the production crew was accused of damaging the flooring and making holes in the ceiling for lighting equipment.

The show has also been criticized for its handling of sexual assault allegations from the contestants. For instance, Keenyah was sexually harassed by a male model on a photo shoot during cycle 4 and the show has been criticized for not doing anything when the model stroked her inner thigh, moaned in her ear, took photos of her and harassed her repeatedly for her phone number. Similarly, in cycle 15, the girls were required to kiss a male model during a commercial. Shortly before the commercial shoot however, Kayla revealed that she was sexually assaulted at eleven years old, tearfully telling Jay Manuel that the "challenge freaks me out" and that "I don't want to interact with them" because men "scare me." Ferrel was still made to do the commercial against her wishes and, later in the competition, had to do three additional photo shoots with male models. Similarly, in cycle 16, during a fan meet and greet challenge, Monique was approached by a man who her asked to sign a photo and write that he was a good kisser on it. She declined but said that fellow contestant Alexandria would do it. After resisting the man's advances repeatedly, she finally gave in and have him a kiss on the cheek. She was criticized by J. Alexander for this, who said this could lead onto "stalking", which many deemed unfair, since she was heavily pressured by the man to do so.

Broadcast history

International broadcasts
America's Next Top Model is currently shown on TV internationally in 170 countries and regions, namely: Australia, the United Kingdom, Japan, Hong Kong, Macau, Taiwan and the whole of Southeast Asia (except Timor-Leste). The following table shows countries and regions that have aired this show:

The channels in bold''' also broadcast their own version of Top Model.

The international versions of Top Model have generally been better received by critics. In an article for The Atlantic, Adrienne Raphel explained that "Oddly enough, it's the foreign Top Model spinoffs that are in the more direct business of producing working models, like Ksenia Kahtovitch and Alice Burdeu, not the beautytainment ... queens of ANTM."

Slate's Torie Bosch points out that the international versions "have retained what works best about ANTM—the in-house drama, the torturous makeovers, the ridiculous assignments—while skipping what's worst about it: hokey judge antics, outlandish veneration of Tyra, and sob-story contestants."

Spin-off

In October 2008, The CW announced that it had ordered a spin-off pilot of America's Next Top Model, titled Operation Fabulous. The proposed show would have starred ANTM creative director Jay Manuel and runway coach Mrs. J. Alexander as they travel the country to provide makeovers to everyday women. Tyra Banks and Ken Mok would have served as executive producers for the new show. However, The CW ultimately declined to pick up the show.

Distribution
Until 2012, only cycle 1 had been released domestically on DVD. This is because the home video license was formerly held by UPN, and was distributed for them by Paramount Home Entertainment. Since the series is now independently produced, the video rights to the remaining cycles have, until recently, been open for acquisition (and therefore, the remaining seasons had yet to be issued on DVD or Blu-ray). However, on May 30, it was announced on the CW that cycles 2 and 3 were available to pre-order on DVD via new licensee CBS Home Entertainment. They are now available for purchase on Amazon.com. Additionally, cycles 4, 5, 6, 7 and 8 were also made into DVDs and sold on the website.

Sponsors
For cycle 1, Revlon sponsored this show with the products and prizes. For cycle 2, Sephora replaced Revlon as the commercial sponsor. Through cycles 3–18, CoverGirl replaced Sephora as the continuation on products and prizes. For cycle 19, shoe retailer Nine West and Smashbox sponsored with campaigns, but the cosmetics sponsorship has ended. For cycle 20, Guess sponsored with a US$100,000 ad campaign for the winner.

Contestants' crossover appearances
 In cycle 3, Taye Diggs from Kevin Hill appeared in the acting challenge. While Yaya DaCosta won the challenge, it was cycle 3 winner Eva Pigford who guest-starred on the show. She later starred on other UPN/CW shows such as Smallville.
 Naima Mora (winner of cycle 4), Kim Stolz (cycle 5), and Furonda Brasfield (cycle 6) were given guest-starring roles on episodes of Veronica Mars. Kim and Furonda's roles were cameos in the same series.
 CariDee English (cycle 7 winner), who won the acting challenge in Episode 9, guest-starred in an episode of One Tree Hill, and later had a cameo appearance in an episode of Gossip Girl. English hosted Oxygen reality TV series Pretty Wicked.
 For cycle 8, the acting-themed episode had Tia Mowry of CW's The Game give the girls a crash course in acting, although the "crossover" was limited to Mowry's appearance, as the challenge winner was not given a guest role as a prize. Instead, Renee DeWitt, who won the challenge, got a surprise visit from her husband and son which she shared with Dionne Walters, whose family also showed up for a surprise visit.
Several other contestants have landed roles on other UPN/CW shows, such as Mercedes Scelba-Shorte (cycle 2), Ann Markley (cycle 3), Toccara Jones (cycle 3) and Cassandra Whitehead (cycle 5).
 Lio Tipton (credited as Analeigh Tipton) and Samantha Potter (both cycle 11) were featured in an episode of The Big Bang Theory which featured the main characters locating the top model house.
 At the E! News preshow for the 81st Academy Awards five contestants were featured modeling Oscar gowns: Ambreal Williams (cycle 9) and Saleisha Stowers (cycle 9 winner), Samantha Potter (cycle 11), Nijah Harris and Natalie Pack (both cycle 12)
 On May 12, 2010, Angelea Preston, Jessica Serfaty, and Simone Lewis (all cycle 14) appeared on a Jay Walking All-Stars segment on The Tonight Show with Jay Leno. On February 24, 2012, Brittany Brower (cycle 4), Bre Scullark (cycle 5) (both cycle 17), and Lisa D'Amato (cycle 5 and cycle 17 winner) appeared on a Jay Walking All-Stars segment on The Tonight Show with Jay Leno.
 On November 21, 2012, Allyssa Vuelma, Jessie Rabideau, and Kiara Belen (all cycle 19) appeared on a Jay Walking All-Stars segment on The Tonight Show with Jay Leno.
 Jenascia Chakos (cycle 2) appeared in 2010 in an episode of Wheel of Fortune.
Lio Tipton (credited as Analeigh Tipton) (cycle 11) played Jessica Riley in the romantic comedy Crazy, Stupid, Love.
 Courtney Davies (cycle 13) appeared in the ABC family TV series Pretty Little Liars as Quinn in a recurring role for 2 episodes in 2011.
 Leslie Mancia (cycle 6), Lisa Jackson (cycle 9), Aminat Ayinde (cycle 12), Nastasia Scott (cycle 19) and Shei Phan (cycle 21) all competed on Project Runway or Project Runway All Stars as models paired with a designer. Lisa (paired with designer Michelle Lesniak Franklin) was the winner of the 11th season of Project Runway.
 Hannah Kat Jones (cycle 16) has appeared on the Disney Channel show Austin and Ally.
 Nyle DiMarco (cycle 22) was a contestant on, and the winner of season 22 of Dancing with the Stars, dancing with Peta Murgatroyd.
 Will Jardell (cycle 21) competed on an online game called Sequester, which is produced by Audrey Middleton of Big Brother fame. Jardell also competed on, and later won, the thirty-second season of The Amazing Race with boyfriend James Wallington.

Future
Since the conclusion of cycle 24, there has been speculation about the show's renewal for a 25th season. By May 2019, a year after cycle 24's conclusion, VH1 had still not announced any news about a renewal or a cancellation. Tyra Banks has expressed interest in a 25th cycle: "You know, we've done [24] cycles of America's Next Top Model, and I feel that we should at least end at 25." Multiple interviews with Banks have indicated that a new cycle was in the planning stages,Speed, Kellie (March 17, 2020). Supermodel Tyra Banks "Chats About The Possible Return Of 'America's Next Top Model' & Being An 'Innovator'". Haute Living. Retrieved April 2, 2020. but there have been no official announcements.

See also
 List of America's Next Top Model contestants
 List of reality television show franchises
 America's Most Smartest Model'' (2007)
 Make Me a Supermodel (2008)
 Model Latina (2008)

References

External links

 
 
 

 
2000s American reality television series
2003 American television series debuts
2010s American reality television series
2015 American television series endings
2016 American television series debuts
2018 American television series endings
American television series revived after cancellation
English-language television shows
Television series by CBS Studios